The Rotax 447 is a , inline 2-cylinder, two-stroke aircraft engine, built by BRP-Rotax GmbH & Co. KG of Austria for use in ultralight aircraft.

Design and development

The modern 447 has a single breakerless, magneto capacitor-discharge ignition (CDI) system. Early (ca. 1988) models use a breaker point ignition system.

The Rotax 447 features piston-ported, air-cooled cylinder heads and cylinders, utilizing either a fan or free air for cooling. Lubrication is by use of pre-mixed fuel and oil. The engine can be equipped with either one or two piston-type float carburetors. The dual-carburetor version uses Bing model 84 carburetors. The single-carburetor version uses a Bing model 54 carburetor.  An optional High Altitude Compensation kit is available. It is typically installed with an induction-pulse-driven diaphragm fuel pump to provide fuel pressure.

The engine's propeller drive is via a Rotax type B gearbox. The standard engine includes a muffler exhaust system with an extra after-muffler as optional. The standard starter is a recoil start type, with an electric starter optional. An integral alternating current generator producing 170 watts at 12 volts with external rectifier-regulator is optional. The engine includes an intake air filter and can be fitted with an intake silencer system.

The manufacturer acknowledges the design limitations of this engine, warning pilots:

Variants
447 UL-1V
basic engine equipped with a single carburettor,  at 6800 rpm
447 UL-2V
basic engine equipped with two carburettors,  at 6800 rpm

Applications

Specifications (447)

References

Rotax engines
Air-cooled aircraft piston engines
Two-stroke aircraft piston engines